Splendrillia debilis is a species of sea snail, a marine gastropod mollusk in the family Drilliidae.

Description
The height of the shell attains 8 mm, its diameter 3.5 mm.

The species is distinguished from Splendrillia aoteana by its much smaller size, the broader shoulder, and the slender, short, oblique costae, sometimes reduced to pointed tubercles on the body whorl, their number being 12 to 14 on the body whorl.

The proboscis is of moderate size compared to the rhynchodeum (a tubular chamber anterior to the proboscis).

Distribution
This marine species occurs off Ninety Mile Beach, North Island, New Zealand

References

 Suter, P. Mal. S., viii, 1908, 185
 Powell, A.W.B. 1942: The New Zealand Recent and fossil Mollusca of the family Turridae with general notes on turrid nomenclature and systematics, Auckland Institute and Museum Bulletin, 2 
 Powell, A.W.B. 1979: New Zealand Mollusca: Marine, Land and Freshwater Shells, Collins, Auckland

External links
 Spencer H.G., Willan R.C., Marshall B.A. & Murray T.J. (2011) Checklist of the Recent Mollusca Recorded from the New Zealand Exclusive Economic Zone
  Tucker, J.K. 2004 Catalog of recent and fossil turrids (Mollusca: Gastropoda). Zootaxa 682:1–1295.

debilis
Gastropods of New Zealand
Gastropods described in 1927